The Bogan was an electoral district of the Legislative Assembly in the Australian state of New South Wales, created in 1859 and named after the Bogan River. It elected two members between 1880 and 1889 and three members between 1889 and 1894. It was abolished in 1894 and partly replaced by Cobar, Dubbo and Coonamble.

Members

Election results

Notes

References

Former electoral districts of New South Wales
Constituencies established in 1859
Constituencies disestablished in 1894
1859 establishments in Australia
1894 disestablishments in Australia